In Your Dreams is the seventh studio album by American singer-songwriter and Fleetwood Mac vocalist Stevie Nicks, released on May 3, 2011 by Reprise Records. It is her first solo studio album since Trouble in Shangri-La (2001) and also coincides with the 30th anniversary of the release of her debut solo album Bella Donna.

On May 11, 2011, Billboard announced that the album had sold 52,418 copies in its first week of release and debuted at No. 6 on the Billboard 200, giving Nicks her fifth top ten album on that chart. The album spent 16 weeks within the Billboard 200 and has sold 199,000 copies in the United States as of May 2014 according to Nielsen SoundScan. In Your Dreams debuted and peaked at No. 14 on the UK Albums Chart, giving Nicks her fifth Top 20 album there. The accompanying 2011/12 tour though only fairly short, grossed $8.7 million in North America alone.

Background and composition
In late February 2010, David A. Stewart (musician and record producer, best known for his work with Eurythmics) revealed, using his Twitter account, that he was working with Nicks on at least four new songs, including one called "Everybody Loves You". A 38-second snippet of the song was posted on Stewart's Twitter account. He confirmed that he and Nicks were working on an album, and said that it is being done "in a very new way".

On March 16, 2010, Stewart reported on his Twitter that he and Nicks were now recording songs together. On BBC Radio 2 on May 3, 2010, he stated in an interview with DJ Simon Mayo that the new album will be recorded throughout June with a release later that year, however this proved premature.

On July 5, 2010, Stewart tweeted several pictures and messages about him and Nicks working in the studio. In one of the tweets, Stewart stated that he, Nicks, Waddy Wachtel, Mike Campbell, Michael Bradford, Mike Rowe and Steve Ferrone were all working on the album, and that Mick Fleetwood has also contributed drums to at least one track. Waddy Wachtel has been Nicks' lead guitarist for most of her solo career, featuring prominently on all of her albums to date. Stewart also stated in that tweet that seven tracks have been completed thus far and it was their final day of these sessions in the studio together. Nicks was scheduled to play five live dates in the United States in August, and then returned to the studio to complete writing and recording on the album.

The cover of the album was released on March 7, 2011, via Nicks' official website. The cover photograph was taken by Kristin Burns and features Nicks and a horse in a forest scene. The track listing was made available soon after.

Singles
The first single, "Secret Love", was released on January 13, 2011. The single was made available for immediate digital download by pre-ordering the album from stevienicks.warnerreprise.com. It is an updated, yet faithful adaptation of the demo that has circulated on the Internet. "Secret Love" peaked at No. 20 on the Billboard Adult Contemporary chart.

A video for "Cheaper Than Free", featuring David A. Stewart, was also released.

"Soldier's Angel" was released to some radio outlets on May 27, 2011. Although the song has not been confirmed to be a single, it has received promotional airplay from several radio stations and by purchasing the song through the Lifetime Network as a download supports "The Yellow Ribbon Fund" for the U.S. Military.

On June 16, 2011, it was announced that "For What It's Worth" would be released as the second single for In Your Dreams, according to a press release issued by Live Nation, which also announced Nicks' concert tour. The single was released to radio on July 11, 2011. The music video for the single was released on August 24, 2011. "For What It's Worth" debuted on the Billboard Adult Contemporary chart at No. 25 on September 22, 2011.

A video for "Moonlight (A Vampire's Dream)" was released on October 13, 2011.

Critical reception

Upon release, the album received mostly positive reviews, with several critics hailing In Your Dreams as the best album of Nicks' solo career.

AllMusic's Stephen Thomas Erlewine commented that producer Stewart's "real coup is focus, letting each element fit snugly together so In Your Dreams winds up capturing the essence of Stevie Nicks, which, as her previous three decades of solo albums prove, is no easy feat.", giving the album 4 of 5 stars. Mikael Wood of Entertainment Weekly gave the release an "A", saying "We'll never complain about hearing Stevie warble the word dreams; indeed, several times here she comes remarkably close to Fleetwood Mac's platinum-plated best."

Promotion
On March 25, 2011, Reprise Records released a promotional trailer for the album.

On April 13, 2011, Nicks appeared on The Oprah Winfrey Show performing the single "Secret Love." A video for the song "Cheaper Than Free" was made available on April 12, 2011 as a free download on the iTunes Store. On April 26, 2011, the music video for the first single "Secret Love" was released. The video features Nicks, Dave Stewart and Mick Fleetwood. The album was available to be streamed in its entirety exclusively at the Rolling Stone website on April 27, 2011.

On account of a bout of pneumonia and the flu, Nicks had to cancel several appearances in New York during the week of her album release, including her appearance on The Today Show and a performance at Webster Hall.

Nicks appeared on The Ellen DeGeneres Show again on May 10, 2011, this time performing her single, "Secret Love". On May 17, 2011, she made an appearance on Dancing with the Stars, performing two songs, "Landslide" and "Secret Love."

Nicks made her first solo promotional visit to the United Kingdom since 1989 in mid-June, appearing on popular TV programs such as BBC Breakfast and Loose Women and doing several interviews for The Sun, The Daily Mail and The Telegraph newspapers and several magazines. On June 26, Nicks appeared at Hard Rock Calling festival in London's Hyde Park (her first solo live appearance in Europe since 1989) and performed for a crowd of 50,000+ people. The following day, Nicks appeared at HMV Oxford Circus for an album signing and fan meet to promote the release of In Your Dreams.

She performed a duet of "Landslide"  with Javier Colon on NBC's The Voice on June 29, 2011.

Nicks appeared on America's Got Talent on July 27, 2011, making the televised debut of her second single from the album, "For What It's Worth", as well as performing her classic "Edge of Seventeen". She also performed the single on The Tonight Show with Jay Leno on July 28.

On August 26, 2011, Nicks performed "For What It's Worth", "Landslide" and "Rhiannon" on Good Morning America, as part of their "Summer Concert Series".

September 13, 2011, she appeared on The Talk performing "Rhiannon", "Edge of Seventeen", "Landslide" and the second single from the new album, "For What It's Worth".

Stevie Nicks: In Your Dreams documentary
The 2010 recording of the studio album, her first in almost a decade, was documented in Nicks' home studio and shows the collaborative process between her and Stewart. The film was directed by Nicks and Stewart, produced by Weapons of Mass Entertainment and released with a limited theatrical run on 2 April 2013 by Abramorama film distribution. A nomination for the Audience Award was received at the 2013 SXSW Film Festival. Reprise Records home video released the DVD and digital video on 3 December 2013.

Track listing

Charts

Personnel
 Stevie Nicks: vocals, keyboards, percussion
 Sharon Celani: backing vocals 
 Lori Nicks: backing vocals
 Mick Fleetwood: drums
 Lindsey Buckingham: guitar, backing vocals on "Soldier's Angel"
 Ned Douglas: keyboards
 Ricky Peterson: Hammond organ, piano
 Mike Rojas: Hammond organ, piano
 Zac Rae: Hammond organ
 Mike Rowe: keyboards, Hammond organ
 Glen Ballard: guitars, keyboards and piano
 David A. Stewart: guitars, vocals
 Tom Bukovac: guitar
 Rob Cavallo: guitar
 Neale Heywood: guitar
 Waddy Wachtel: guitar
 Greg Leisz: mandolin
 Mike Campbell: guitar, bass, keyboards, drums, percussion
 Mike Bradford: bass 
 Simon Smith: bass
 Michael Rhodes: bass
 Al Ortiz: bass
 Chad Cromwell: drums 
 Steve Ferrone: drums
 Blair Sinta: drums
 Scott Campbell: drum programming and additional percussion
Lenny Castro: percussion
 Mike Fasano: percussion
 Ann Marie Calhoun: violin
 Torrey DeVitto: violin

Production
 Produced by Glen Ballard, Mike Campbell & Dave Stewart
 Engineers: Scott Campbell, Ned Douglas, Karen Johnston, Mike Linett, John McBride
 Recording assistants: Marcus Johnson, Shin Miyazawa, Chris Owens
 Mixing: Chris Lord-Alge; assisted by Keith Armstrong, Nik Karpin, Andrew Schubert & Brad Townsend
 Mastered by Ted Jensen

References

2011 albums
Stevie Nicks albums
Albums produced by Glen Ballard
Albums produced by David A. Stewart
Reprise Records albums